Heraclius Constantine (3 May 612 – 25 May 641), often enumerated as Constantine III, was one of the shortest reigning Byzantine emperors, ruling for three months in 641. He was the eldest son of Emperor Heraclius and his first wife Eudokia.

Reign
Constantine was crowned co-emperor by his father on 22 January 613 and shortly after was betrothed to his cousin, Gregoria, a daughter of his father's first cousin, Nicetas. As the couple were second cousins, the marriage was technically incestuous, but this consideration must have been outweighed by the advantages of the match to the family as a whole. Furthermore, its illegality paled into insignificance beside Heraclius' marriage to his niece Martina the same year.  In comparison, Constantine's marriage was far less scandalous than that of his father. Constantine assumed an honorary consulship on 1 January 632, and at the same ceremony his brother Heraclonas was raised to the rank of caesar.

Constantine became senior emperor when his father died on 11 February 641. He reigned together with his younger half-brother Heraclonas, the son of Martina. His supporters feared action against him on the part of Martina and Heraclonas, and the treasurer Philagrius advised him to write to the army, informing them that he was dying and asking for their assistance in protecting the rights of his children. He also sent a vast sum of money, more than two million solidi (gold coins), to Valentinus, an adjutant of Philagrius, to distribute to the soldiers to persuade them to secure the succession for his sons after his death. He died of tuberculosis after only three months, on 25 May, leaving Heraclonas sole emperor. A rumor that Martina had him poisoned led first to the imposition of Constans II as co-emperor and then to the deposition, mutilation, and banishment of Martina and her sons.

Family
In 629 or 630, Constantine married Gregoria, the daughter of Niketas. They had two sons: 
 Constans II, who succeeded as emperor
 Theodosius

Notes

See also

List of Byzantine emperors

References

Literature
 
 
 

 
 
 
 
 
 
 
 

612 births
641 deaths
640s in the Byzantine Empire
7th-century Byzantine emperors
7th-century deaths from tuberculosis
Heraclian dynasty
Heraclius
Porphyrogennetoi
Tuberculosis deaths in the Byzantine Empire
Sons of Byzantine emperors